John Nixon (1733 – December 31, 1808) was a financier and official from Philadelphia who served as a militia officer in the American Revolutionary War. On July 8, 1776, he made the first public proclamation of the Declaration of Independence and read it from the steps of the Pennsylvania State House, now known as Independence Hall. 

Nixon was born in Philadelphia, the son of a shipping merchant.  Upon the passage of the Stamp Act in 1765, he signed the non-importation agreement against the Act, became active in opposing the encroachments of the English government upon American liberties, and was a member of the first committee of correspondence in Pennsylvania.

In April 1775, he became lieutenant-colonel of the third battalion of the Philadelphia Associators, a militia unit. He was also a member of the Committee of Safety.  From May to July 1776, he was in command of the defenses of the Delaware River at Fort Island, after which he was put in charge of the defenses of Philadelphia.

In 1776 Nixon was promoted colonel and later served under George Washington at the Battle of Princeton. He became a member of the Navy Board, and two years later was with Washington again at Valley Forge.

In 1780, he became a director of the Bank of Pennsylvania.  Afterward he assisted in organizing the Bank of North America, of which he was president from 1792 until his death.

Nixon died in 1808; he was interred in the churchyard of St. Peter's Church, Philadelphia.

Biographical sketch

NIXON, John, soldier, was born in Philadelphia, Pa., in 1733. His father was a wealthy shipping merchant who left his son his business at his death in 1756. John Nixon was among those who signed the non-importation agreement of 1765, from which time on he was one of the leaders of the patriot cause in Philadelphia. He was a member of the first committee of correspondence and of the committee of public safety, served in the provincial conventions of 1774 and 1775, and in April. 1775, was chosen lieutenant-colonel of the 3rd Philadelphia battalion. In May, 1776, he commanded the defences of the Delaware, from which he was transferred in July, 1776, and was assigned to the command of the city guard of Philadelphia. He was the first to read the declaration of independence to an assemblage of citizens after its adoption. In the summer of 1776 his battalion served at Amboy. In the following December, Nixon, having in the meantime succeeded to the chief command, reinforced Washington at Trenton and participated in the battle of Princeton. In 1776 Nixon served on the navy board and in 1778 he spent the winter at Valley Forge. When a bank to provision the army was formed in 1780 he became its first director. He was also one of the founders of the Bank of North America, established in 1783, and its president from 1792 until his death, which occurred December 31, 1808.

References

External links
 Biography at virtualology.com
 Biography at the University of Pennsylvania

1733 births
1808 deaths
American bankers
Pennsylvania militiamen in the American Revolution
Businesspeople from Philadelphia
People of colonial Pennsylvania
Burials at St. Peter's churchyard, Philadelphia
United States Declaration of Independence